General elections were held in Malta on 13 and 14 October 1911. Candidates ran in only three of the eight seats, with five remaining empty.

Background
The elections were held under the Chamberlain Constitution, with members elected from eight single-member constituencies.

Results
A total of 8,986 people were registered to vote.

References

1911
Malta
1911 in Malta
October 1911 events
Malta